Palisades Park may refer to:

Palisades Park, New Jersey, a borough in Bergen County, New Jersey
Palisades Amusement Park, a defunct amusement park in Bergen County, New Jersey
"Palisades Park" (Freddy Cannon song), 1962 recording inspired by the park
"Palisades Park" (Counting Crows song), 2014 recording inspired by the park
Palisades Park (Santa Monica), a park along the Pacific coastline in Santa Monica, California

See also
Palisades Interstate Park Commission, joint New York and New Jersey commission to oversee parks along the Palisades on the west bank of the Hudson River
Palisades Interstate Parkway, highway running north from the George Washington Bridge in Bergen County, New Jersey to Rockland County and Orange County in the state of New York
 Pacific Palisades, Los Angeles